The Richard B. Russell Federal Building is a 26-story International style building in Atlanta, Georgia, housing U.S. government agency offices and federal courts.

The building was constructed in 1978, on the site of the former Terminal Station, which was razed in 1972, except for one platform retained by Southern Railway for its use.

References

External links
 U.S. District Court for the Northern District of Georgia

Government buildings completed in 1978
Federal courthouses in the United States
Office buildings in Atlanta
Courthouses in Georgia (U.S. state)
1978 establishments in Georgia (U.S. state)